Doha Hany Mostafa (born 10 September 1997) is an Egyptian badminton player. She started playing badminton at aged five, and joined the national team in 2013. She won the bronze medal at the 2014 African Youth Games, and represented her country at the Summer Youth Olympics in Nanjing, China. She was the women's doubles gold medalist at the 2019 African Games. Hany featured in Egypt team that for the first time won the All Africa Women's Team Championships in 2020, also claimed two title in the individual competition by winning the women's and mixed doubles event. She competed at the 2020 Summer Olympics in three different events; women's singles, doubles and mixed doubles.

Achievements

African Games 
Women's singles

Women's doubles

Mixed doubles

African Championships 
Women's singles

Women's doubles

Mixed doubles

Mediterranean Games 
Women's singles

African Youth Games 
Girls' singles

Girls' doubles

African Junior Championships 
Girls' doubles

BWF International Challenge/Series (18 titles, 12 runners-up) 
Women's singles

Women's doubles

Mixed doubles

  BWF International Challenge tournament
  BWF International Series tournament
  BWF Future Series tournament

BWF Junior International (2 titles, 1 runner-up) 
Girls' singles

  BWF Junior International Grand Prix tournament
  BWF Junior International Challenge tournament
  BWF Junior International Series tournament
  BWF Junior Future Series tournament

Performance timeline

National team 
 Junior level

 Senior level

Individual competitions 
 Junior level

 Senior level

References

External links 
 
 

1997 births
Living people
Sportspeople from Cairo
Egyptian female badminton players
Badminton players at the 2014 Summer Youth Olympics
Badminton players at the 2020 Summer Olympics
Olympic badminton players of Egypt
Competitors at the 2019 African Games
African Games gold medalists for Egypt
African Games silver medalists for Egypt
African Games bronze medalists for Egypt
African Games medalists in badminton
Competitors at the 2018 Mediterranean Games
Competitors at the 2022 Mediterranean Games
Mediterranean Games bronze medalists for Egypt
Mediterranean Games medalists in badminton
21st-century Egyptian women